This is a list of people known as the Great, or the equivalent, in their own language. Other languages have their own suffixes, such as Persian e Bozorg and Urdu e Azam.

In Persia, the title "the Great" at first seems to have been a colloquial version of the Old Persian title "Great King". It was first used by Cyrus II of Persia. The title was inherited by Alexander III when he conquered the Persian Empire, and the epithet eventually became personally associated with him. The first reference to this is in a comedy by Plautus, in which it is assumed that everyone knew who "Alexander the Great" was; however, there is no evidence that he was called "the Great" before this. The early Seleucid kings, who succeeded Alexander in Persia, used "Great King" in local documents, but the title was most notably used for Antiochus the Great. Once the term gained currency, it was broadened to include persons in other fields, such as the philosopher Albert the Great.

Later rulers and commanders were given the epithet during their lifetime, for example, the Roman general Pompey. Others received the title posthumously, such as the Indian emperor Ashoka. As there are no objective criteria for "greatness", the persistence of the designation varies greatly. For example, Louis XIV of France was often referred to as "the Great" in his lifetime, but is rarely called such nowadays, later writers preferring his more specific epithet "the Sun King". German Emperor Wilhelm I was often called "the Great" in the time of his grandson Wilhelm II, but rarely before or after.

Monarchs

Aristocrats

Military

Religious figures

Christian

Jewish

Legendary and mythological figures

See also 

 List of monarchs by nickname
 James Stanley, 7th Earl of Derby (1607–1651), "Yn Stanlagh Mooar" ("the Great Stanley"), also Lord of Mann
 Bantul the Great, a Bengali comic strip character

Notes

References 

Lists of people by epithet